Weishan may refer to:

Places
Weishan Yi and Hui Autonomous County, Yunnan
Weishan County, Shandong
Weishan Lake
Weishan, Zhejiang, town in Dongyang
Weishan Township, Ningxiang, Hunan
Weishan Town, Liling, Hunan
Weishan, Xinhua, Hunan

People
Weishan Liu, Chinese–American guzheng player
Michael Weishan, American TV host
Zheng Weishan (1915–2000), Chinese general and politician
Wu Weishan (born 1962), Chinese curator and academic

See also